Unlicensed developers and fans have created unofficial Sonic media, especially video games, relating to the Sonic the Hedgehog franchise. These products include video games, video game mods, ROM hacks, comics, and animations. Due to the popularity of the franchise, some of these products have received media attention. Sega is permissive of most fangames, as long as they are not for profit.

Video games

Fangames
The following are all original games based on the Sonic series.
Green Hill Paradise Act 2 is a 3D Sonic game built by Daniel "SuperSonic68" Coyle and other collaborators with the 3D Sonic Games Development Kit. This game gained notability for receiving a positive response from Sega.
Sonic Utopia is an open-world, 3D Sonic game, currently in development.
Sonic Before the Sequel is a 2D Sonic game set in between the events of Sonic the Hedgehog and Sonic the Hedgehog 2. The game's original release in 2011 had a soundtrack with reused music coming from different video game franchises like Kirby, but a second release in 2013 came with original music specifically for the game. The game received wide critical praise for its faithfulness to earlier titles. Two sequels, Sonic After the Sequel and Sonic Chrono Adventure, were later developed and released in 2013, the latter incorporating Metroidvania and time travel elements.
Sonic Dreams Collection is a parody game presented as a Dreamcast development kit containing cancelled Sonic games. The game caught media attention for its bizarre nature and its intent to lampoon the Sonic fandom.
Sonic Fan Remix is a 2.5D Sonic game created in Unity that features reimagined levels from past Sonic games.
Retro Sonic is a 2D Sonic game created by Christian Whitehead. It is the first game to use the Retro Engine (the engine used for the 2011 remaster of Sonic CD), and later merged with two other Sonic fangames, Sonic Nexus and Sonic XG, to form Retro Sonic Nexus, a collaboration project made by Christian Whitehead. Retro Sonic Nexus was ultimately cancelled in 2011, splitting up the three projects, while Christian went on to work with Sega to make the 2011 remaster of Sonic CD.
Sonic Robo Blast 2 is a 3D Sonic game that uses a modified version of the Doom Legacy engine and has been in development since 1998. The game gained notability for being the first 3D Sonic fangame, and it continues to be updated by its developers and supported by its community to the present day. A kart racing variant, Sonic Robo Blast 2 Kart, was released in November 2018 using the same engine.
Chao Resort Island is a fangame for Microsoft Windows and macOS, based upon the Chao-raising minigames in Sonic Adventure.
Sonic World is a game heavily based upon the Sonic Adventure titles and Sonic Heroes. It features over 30 playable characters and the ability to make Heroes-style teams, as well as remastered levels from various Sonic games. In 2020, an upgraded version called Sonic World DX was released for the Sonic Amateur Games Expo 2020.
Sonic Z-treme is a homebrew Sega Saturn game that aims to recreate concepts from the canceled game Sonic X-treme using original code. It can be made to run on real Saturn hardware if it is burned to a disc.
Sonic the Hedgehog 2 HD is a high-definition fan remaster of Sonic the Hedgehog 2 in development. The final version is planned to feature additional stages and the ability to play levels as Knuckles the Echidna.
Sonic Omens is an episodic 3D Sonic game that garnered controversy regarding its funding through Patreon. Discourse surrounding the project lead Sonic social media manager Katie "MiniKitty" to clarify via Twitter that “So long as no profit is involved, there is usually no issue with y’all using our blue boy to hone your art and dev skills – but, for legal reasons, I can’t promise all content is OK”.
Sonic GT is a 3D Sonic game that iterates on gameplay elements from the series' official 3D entries.
Sonic 3D in 2D is a reimagining of Sonic 3D Blast as a classic-style 2D Sonic game. Unlike the original, Tails and Knuckles are included as playable characters and retain their abilities from the classic titles.
Virtua Sonic is a 3D Sonic virtual reality game. The player takes control of Sonic from a first-person perspective and must pump their arms in the air to accelerate forward. Additional speed can be acquired by taking advantage of the game's level terrain. It debuted at the 2020 Sonic Amateur Games Expo and supports SteamVR-compatible headsets.
Sonic and the Fallen Star is a 2D Sonic game featuring original levels and music. It is inspired by multiple 2D Sonic titles, Sonic Heroes, and the Before the Sequel and After the Sequel fangames.
Sonic Time Twisted is a 2D Sonic game in the style of the 16-bit titles. It includes multiple playable characters, original levels, and time travel elements.

Unofficial ports
The following are unofficial ports of Sonic games for various systems.
Somari is a pirated version of Sonic the Hedgehog released for the Nintendo Entertainment System in 1994. However, rather than starring Sonic, the game features a character named "Somari", who is essentially Nintendo's mascot Mario wearing Miles "Tails" Prower's shoes. There is also a ROM hack of the original Sonic the Hedgehog for the Genesis that takes inspiration from Somari, made by a talented Sonic hacker.
 Sonic 3: Angel Island Revisited (also called Sonic 3 A.I.R.) is a port of Sonic 3 & Knuckles to PC and mobile devices based on the ROM file for the original Genesis release. The port was first released in 2019.
 Sonic 1 SMS Remake and Sonic 2 SMS Remake are unofficial remakes of the 8-bit Sonic the Hedgehog and Sonic the Hedgehog 2 Master System games, released in 2019 and 2020 respectively for Microsoft Windows and Android. The remakes feature widescreen gameplay and add new playable characters, levels, and game mechanics from other Sonic games.
A Commodore 64 port of the 8-bit Sonic the Hedgehog was released on December 21, 2021. It is the first game to require the REU expansion cartridge, due to the game's intensive design for the C64 base hardware.
Sonic Chaos is an unofficial remake of the 8-bit 1993 game of the same name. It features Sonic Mania-style gameplay elements, sprites and graphics, as well as new game mechanics and boss fights. The remake is in development.
Sonic P-06 is an unofficial remake of Sonic the Hedgehog (2006) for Windows powered by Unity. It is in development and has released several demos.
Zippy the Porcupine is an Atari 2600 demake of the original Sonic the Hedgehog.
A tech demo based on the 16-bit version of Sonic the Hedgehog was created for the Super Nintendo Entertainment System, featuring the third act of Green Hill Zone. The demo was developed with the original game's code optimized for and playable on Super NES hardware.
Sonic Triple Trouble 16-bit is an unofficial remake of the titular Game Gear game for Windows. Proposed as a theoretical successor to Sonic 3 & Knuckles for home consoles, the remake features similar gameplay, graphics, and sound to that of official 16-bit Sonic games. Other additions include updated level design and the ability to switch between Sonic and Tails in real time.

Mods and ROM hacks
The following are some of the modified versions of existing Sonic games, created using special programs and utilities.
Unleashed Project is a mod of Sonic Generations developed by Team Unleashed that consists of modders Dario FF, S0LV0, ChimeraReiax, and MilesGBOY that ports most of the daytime stages from Sonic Unleashed. The mod additionally features new textures and shading techniques designed to mimic those featured in Sonic Unleashed, and a revamped hub world.
Sonic the Hedgehog Megamix is a total conversion mod of Sonic the Hedgehog developed by Team Megamix. The modified game features redesigned levels and multiple playable characters, each with unique abilities. Originally created on Sega Genesis hardware, Sonic the Hedgehog Megamix was eventually moved to the Sega CD in order to take advantage of the system's improved storage and CD audio capabilities.
Super Mario Generations is a mod of Sonic Generations developed by Daku Neko that replaces characters with those from the Mario series, and alters some of the sound and graphical effects of the game to make it more close to that of Mario. It is notable for making an appearance in the modding section of Guinness World Records 2017: Gamer's Edition.
Motobug the Badnik in Sonic the Hedgehog is a hack of Sonic the Hedgehog that replaces Sonic with a Motobug, as well as altered stage design in a few levels. The programmer, Polygon Jim (who passed away in 2013), was the inspiration to the name of the Motobug Heavy Rider rides in Sonic Mania as a tribute.
Knuckles in Sonic 1 is a hack of Sonic the Hedgehog created by Simon "Stealth" Thomley which replaces Sonic with Knuckles the Echidna, complete with his moveset and sprites from Sonic & Knuckles.
Sonic 1 Boomed is a hack of Sonic the Hedgehog that implements Sonic's redesign from the Sonic Boom animated series, and adds numerous voice clips for Sonic and Dr. Eggman that play throughout the game, such as when the player jumps or collects rings.
Sonic 2 XL is a hack of Sonic the Hedgehog 2 that replaces the game's golden rings with onion rings that cause Sonic to become morbidly obese when he collects them, noticeably slowing him down and hindering his jump and ability to Spin Dash. If Sonic gets too obese, he'll lose a life, but he'll lose weight over time by simply running for a while, and hitting ? monitors will instantly remove all his body fat. The primary challenge of the hack is to collect as few rings as possible.
The S Factor: Sonia and Silver is a work-in-progress multi-level hack of Sonic the Hedgehog which centers around Sonia the Hedgehog, Sonic's sister who appeared in the TV series Sonic Underground, and Silver the Hedgehog, a time-traveling, psychokinetic hedgehog who first appeared in 2006's Sonic the Hedgehog, who each have unique abilities. Scourge the Hedgehog from Archie Comics' Sonic the Hedgehog comic series can also be unlocked.
Yoshi in Sonic the Hedgehog 2 is a hack of Sonic the Hedgehog 2 that replaces Sonic with Yoshi, complete with his abilities from Yoshi's Island.
Sonic 2 Long Version is a hack of Sonic the Hedgehog 2 that attempts to restore the scrapped levels from the original game's development cycle, such as Sand Shower (or Dust Hill), Genocide City (or Cyber City) and Hidden Palace.
An unofficial Hebrew translation of the original Sonic the Hedgehog was released by Barashka in 2017.
Sonic 3D Blast: Director's Cut is a hack of Sonic 3D Blast (Genesis) released by the game's lead programmer, Jon Burton, in 2017. It features improved controls and gameplay additions not seen in the original version, such as a level editor, a password save system, time attack challenges, and the ability to transform into Super Sonic.
 is a ROM hack of the 1999 Nintendo 64 fighting game Super Smash Bros. It retains the gameplay style of the original release while adding new gameplay modes, stages, and characters. An update to the mod in February 2022 added Sonic and Super Sonic as playable characters, along with Sonic the Hedgehog-themed stages and music.
Sonic the Hedgehog 4 (not to be confused with the official Sonic 4) is an unlicensed Super NES game and a ROM hack of Speedy Gonzales: Los Gatos Bandidos (1995). Featuring Sonic in place of the eponymous character, the player can collect rings and free Nintendo's Mario (replacing the mice from the original game) from an assortment of cages.
Originally exclusive to the Wii U, Sonic Lost World Yoshi and Zelda-themed DLCs were recreated in the game's PC version as mods.
Sonic Generations First Person Mod is a mod of Sonic Generations created by Twitter user Skyth that puts people in the POV of Sonic with no camera stabilization. The mod was released in a tweet, saying "POV: you're sonic", and "warning: this video is going to badly hurt your eyes", and to also play at the user's own risk, due to the mod majorly being vomit inducing.
SM64 Generations (not to be confused with Super Mario Generations (see above)) is a mod of Sonic Generations. Players take control of Mario in place of Sonic, accompanied by his 3D model, movesets, and physics from Super Mario 64. The differences between Sonic and Mario's gameplay results in some levels becoming extremely difficult or impossible to complete. The mod requires a ROM image of the US version of Super Mario 64 to work.
Hellfire Saga is a hack of Sonic 3 & Knuckles created by Red Miso Studios. The hack features a new campaign where Sonic battles monsters, demons, and other hellish foes as he tries to escape to his home world. The hack is heavily inspired by games such as Castlevania and Ghosts and Goblins, and uses many elements from its games, such as bosses, music, and art. The hack was in development for five years, and was released on January 30th, 2023.

Film and animation
 Super Mario Bros. Z (2006–2012; 2016–present) is an online crossover sprite animated series created by Mark Haynes for Newgrounds, which starred Mario and Sonic the Hedgehog characters in a plot based on Dragon Ball Z. The series was later remade beginning in 2015, however Nintendo took down the series' Patreon account. The series is referenced in the official comic miniseries Sonic the Hedgehog: Scrapnik Island, in which Mecha Sonic says a same line by the same character within the series.
Sonic in JAWS is a 2009 comedic short film produced by BalenaProductions, which seems to be animated in Garry's Mod. The film itself is a short remake of the 1975 film, Jaws, with Sonic and Tails in the roles of Martin Brody and Matt Hooper respectively, and Conker the Squirrel in the role of Quint. In 2011, it subsequently got remade and remastered in HD.
Sonic is a live-action/computer-animated 2013 short film written and directed by filmmaker Eddie Lebron and produced by Blue Core Studios, intended to be a prequel to the original video game. Jaleel White, who provided Sonic's voice for DIC Entertainment's cartoons, reprised his role, and numerous internet personalities make appearances. At the time, Lebron hoped that the film would lead to a deal with Sega for an official feature-length Sonic film. Yuji Naka, co-creator of the series, called the film "awesome".
Sea3on is a fan-made continuation of the Sonic the Hedgehog (SatAM) animated television series, basing the plotlines on both Ben Hurst's original notes as well as the group's active webcomic. Ron Myrick, the executive producer of SatAM's second season, is involved, while Johnny Gioeli of Crush 40 performed the theme song of the original series for this project.
Sonic and Tails R is an audio drama series created by Emi Jones (EmuEmi), who also voices Tails within it, and Doryan Nelson. Several past voice actors from the Sonic games reprise their roles, including Ryan Drummond and Mike Pollock as Sonic and Dr. Eggman respectively.

Comics
Sonic the Comic Online is an unofficial webcomic continuation of Sonic the Comic. It was mentioned in the video game magazine GamesTM and received positively by the alumni staff, such as Nigel Kitching, Roberto Corona and Andy Diggle.
Archie Sonic Online is an unofficial webcomic continuation of Archie Comics' Sonic the Hedgehog series, which starts from where the pre-reboot continuity left off.
Archie Sonic Restoration is a fan completion of the unfinished post-reboot issues of Archie Comics' Sonic the Hedgehog series, which were scrapped when Sega and Archie Comics cut ties with each other.

Fansites
 TSSZ News was a Sonic-focused news website founded in 1999. The website was shut down in 2020 by its owner after posting a controversial tweet that compared the events of certain Sonic games' plots to Black Lives Matter protests.
 Sonic Amateur Games Expo, known as SAGE for short, is an annual online event which began in 2000 and hosted by the Sonic Fan Games HQ website. The event spotlights Sonic fangames and original game projects in development.

References 

Unofficial
Sonic
 
Sonic
Unofficial adaptations